Felix F. Feist (July 15, 1883 - April 15, 1936) was a lyricist and Metro-Goldwyn-Mayer executive. He wrote the lyrics for songs in several Broadway shows. Leo Feist was his brother, Felix E. Feist was his son, and Raymond E. Feist is his grandson. Several of the songs he wrote the lyrics for became prominent. "Strolling 'Long the Pike" was a song set at the 1904 World's Fair in St. Louis. Ada Jones recorded the song "Bull Frog & Coon" in 1906 for Edison Records. It was also recorded by the Five Brown Brothers in 1911. Feist wrote the lyrics for the song now known as "Skidamarink", a popular children's song.

Works
"Skiddy-Mer-Rink-A-Doo" and the lyrics to other songs for the Broadway show The Echo
"Get Your Partner for the Barn Dance" (1908) from the musical Fluffy Ruffles
"Stolling 'Long the Pike", 1904 World's Fair
Señora Waltzes
"My little Zu-oo-oo-lu", Love in a Jungle
"Johnnie was a Drummer Boy"
"L-o-v-e spells Trouble to me" composed by Joel P. Corin performed by Arthur Collins
Bull Frog & Coon performed by Five Brown Brothers
"I'm Going on the War Path" (1908), lyrics

References

1883 births
1936 deaths
American lyricists